Characichnos (meaning "score trace") is an ichnogenus of possibly dinosaurian tetrapod footprint. It includes a single species, C. tridactylus, known from prints found in the Middle Jurassic Saltwick Formation of Yorkshire, United Kingdom.

Description 
Characichnos traces were created by a "punting" tetrapod, meaning that the animal was drifting or partially buoyant in a body of water, and touching or pushing off from the ground with the feet.

Paleoecology 

Other fossils from the Saltwick Formation consist of stegosaurian footprints and a caudal vertebra belonging to an eusauropod, nicknamed "Alan".

See also 

 List of dinosaur ichnogenera

References 

Dinosaur trace fossils
Fossil trackways
Fossil taxa described in 2001